Ensanche Quisqueya is a sector or neighborhood in the city of Santo Domingo in the Distrito Nacional of the Dominican Republic. This neighborhood is in particular populated by individuals from the upper middle class.

Sources 
Distrito Nacional sectors

Populated places in Santo Domingo